Željko Babić may refer to:

 Zeljko Babic (born 1976), Australian soccer player
 Željko Babić (handballer) (born 1972), Croatian handball player and coach